Alexander Vlassov (born 25 February 1955) is a former Soviet pair skater who currently works as a coach. With partner Irina Vorobieva, he won the silver medal at the 1977 World Figure Skating Championships and the silver medal at the 1977 European Figure Skating Championships. They placed 4th at the 1976 Winter Olympics. They were coached by Tamara Moskvina. He later skated with Zhanna Ilina.

Family
Vlassov is the father and coach of Julia Vlassov. Currently Alexander and his wife Laura are working as a figure skating coaches in Washington, DC

Competitive highlights

With Vorobieva

1974 Spartakiada results used for Soviet Nationals

With Ilina

References

Links
 
 Skatabase: 1970s Europeans
 Skatabase: 1970s Worlds

Soviet male pair skaters
Olympic figure skaters of the Soviet Union
Figure skaters at the 1976 Winter Olympics
Living people
1955 births
World Figure Skating Championships medalists
European Figure Skating Championships medalists
Russian emigrants to the United States
Russian figure skating coaches
Figure skaters from Saint Petersburg
Russian male pair skaters